Němeček (feminine Němečková) is a Czech surname, meaning "a small German". It is a diminutive of Němec, meaning "a German". Notable people include:

 Bohumil Němeček, Czech boxer
 Jan Němeček, Czech ice hockey player
 Lenka Němečková, Czech tennis player
 Libor Němeček, Czech tennis player
 Svatopluk Němeček, Czech politician
 Václav Němeček, Czech footballer

Czech-language surnames